William Percey Wennington (born April 26, 1963) is a Canadian former professional basketball player who won three National Basketball Association (NBA) championships with the Chicago Bulls. A center, he represented Canada in the 1984 Olympics and 1983 World University Games, where the team won gold. He was also on the Canadian team that narrowly missed qualification for the 1992 Olympics. Wennington has been inducted into the Quebec Basketball Hall of Fame and the Canadian Basketball Hall of Fame.

Amateur career
Born in Montreal, Wennington later attended New York's Long Island Lutheran Middle and High School, where he played under coach Bob McKillop, and led the Crusaders to, at one time, a No. 1 ranking in the northeast region, and a top 10 ranking in the nation. He then was recruited to St. John's University, and he played on one NCAA Final Four team under basketball coach Lou Carnesecca.

Professional career
He was drafted 16th in the first round of the 1985 NBA draft by the Dallas Mavericks, where he played his first several seasons. Wennington made his NBA debut on October 29, 1985. On June 26, 1990, he was traded to the Sacramento Kings along with two 1990 first-round draft picks in exchange for Rodney McCray and two future second-round draft picks.

Before signing as a free agent with the Chicago Bulls in 1993, he spent a few years in Italy playing for Virtus (Knorr) from Bologna. In 1998, Chicago-area McDonald's restaurants sold a sandwich named after Wennington called the Beef Wennington. After the break-up of the highly successful Chicago Bulls of the 1990s, Wennington played his final NBA season with the Sacramento Kings. He played alongside Ron Harper, Michael Jordan, Scottie Pippen and Dennis Rodman. Wennington was the backup center for Luc Longley.

Post-basketball career
After his playing career ended, Wennington became a radio color commentator for the Bulls. Wennington was inducted into the Canadian Basketball Hall of Fame in 2005.

See also
List of Montreal athletes
List of famous Montrealers

References

External links

CSTV.com with story on Wennington's induction into the Canadian Basketball Hall of Fame
Career Statistics

1963 births
Living people
Anglophone Quebec people
Basketball players from Montreal
Basketball players at the 1984 Summer Olympics
Canadian expatriate basketball people in Italy
Canadian expatriate basketball people in the United States
Canadian men's basketball players
1982 FIBA World Championship players
Canadian radio sportscasters
Centers (basketball)
Chicago Bulls announcers
Chicago Bulls players
Dallas Mavericks draft picks
Dallas Mavericks players
McDonald's High School All-Americans
Medalists at the 1983 Summer Universiade
National Basketball Association players from Canada
Olympic basketball players of Canada
Parade High School All-Americans (boys' basketball)
People from Long Island
Sacramento Kings players
St. John's Red Storm men's basketball players
Virtus Bologna players
Universiade gold medalists for Canada
Universiade medalists in basketball